A.P.O. Orfeas (or Orpheus), is a Greek football club, firstly established in 1928 under the name "Olympias", located in Egaleo, Athens.

In 1968 Olympias merged with the local clubs "Ierapolis"  and "Defence", so Orfeas was ever born. The club took the name of Orfeas Tzanetopoulos who was appointed as mayor without been elected, by the Greek military government (1967–74).

The team took part in the local Athenian leagues until, in 1971, was firstly promoted for the Beta Ethniki playing there for most of the next years (1971–73, 1975–77).

Orfeas also participated in Gamma Ethniki (later Delta Ethniki), in 1970–71, 1974–75 and 1977–78 periods.

Notable former managers
Sofoklis Koulidis
Nikolaos Bairaktaris
Savvas Papazoglou

Sources
Nikos Dim. Nikolaidis, "50 years Aegaleo"-Published by Aegaleo Municipality-1998

Football clubs in Attica
Association football clubs established in 1928
1928 establishments in Greece